Guy Nadon, CM (born August 28, 1952 in Montreal, Quebec) is a French-Canadian actor. Though his most notable English-language role was arguably in H2O, his other works have been in his first language of French. In 2010, he was appointed a Member of the Order of Canada.

Film

References

External links
 

1952 births
Male actors from Montreal
Canadian male television actors
Canadian male film actors
French Quebecers
Living people
Members of the Order of Canada